"Loquita" is a song recorded by Greek singer Eleni Foureira and Greek-Albanian singer and songwriter Claydee.

Personnel 

Credits adapted from Tidal.

 Eleni Foureira – performing, producing, songwriting, vocals
 Klejdi Llupa – composing, performing, producing, songwriting, vocals

Charts

Release history

References 

2019 singles
2019 songs
Eleni Foureira songs
Spanish-language songs
Number-one singles in Greece
English-language Greek songs
Songs written by Claydee
Song recordings produced by Claydee